Morrow is an unincorporated community and census-designated place (CDP) in Washington County, Arkansas, United States. A post office has been in operation at Morrow since 1883; The community had the name of G. W. Morrow, an early postmaster. it was first listed as a CDP in the 2020 census with a population of 263; 

Morrow has a post office with ZIP code 72749.

Education
The community is served by the Lincoln Consolidated School District. Lincoln High School is its sole high school.

Demographics

2020 census

Note: the US Census treats Hispanic/Latino as an ethnic category. This table excludes Latinos from the racial categories and assigns them to a separate category. Hispanics/Latinos can be of any race.

References

Unincorporated communities in Washington County, Arkansas
Unincorporated communities in Arkansas
Census-designated places in Washington County, Arkansas
Census-designated places in Arkansas